S. P. Muthuraman, also referred to as SPM, is an Indian film director who works in the Tamil film industry. He has directed 72 films in Tamil. He was one of the most successful commercial directors in Tamil cinema. Initially he worked mainly with R. Muthuraman, Jaishankar, Sivaji Ganesan and went on to direct successful films with Rajinikanth and Kamal Haasan.

S. P. Muthuraman debuted as an assistant director in the film Kalathur Kannamma (1960). He has received two South Filmfare Awards and a Best Director award from the Tamil Nadu State Government.

Since 1977, his association with Rajinikanth proved to be extremely successful, as they went on work together in 25 films. Muthuraman was mainly responsible for moulding Rajini's career and turning him into a commercial star. He was also the associate producer of the Rajinikanth starrer Sivaji.

Early life and family 

Muthuraman was born on 7 April 1935 as the second of seven children in a family in Karaikudi. As per the norms in their region, Muthuraman's parents gave him another name - Rajaram Mohan - which became obsolete over time.  His father Karaikudi Rama. Subbaiah was one of the forerunners of the Dravidian Movement and a member of the erstwhile Tamil Nadu Legislative Council during 1972-78. Muthuraman's  youngest brother is the Dravidian ideologue Suba Veerapandian.

Career 
After working as office boy to assistant editor for Thendral magazine owned by Kannadasan, Muthuraman initially dreamt of becoming a screenwriter and expressed his interest to join story department in AVM Productions but Meiyappan insisted him to join editing department to learn the craft of filmmaking thus he started his film career through AVM Productions as an assistant editor, then an assistant director to the duo Krishnan–Panju, eventually working with A. Bhimsingh, D. Yoganand, Puttanna Kanagal, M. Krishnan Nair and A. C. Tirulokchandar.

Personal life 
He married Kamala in 1957. The couple have 3 children. His wife Kamala died on 15 October 1992 before the release of his 70th film, Pandiyan.

Other works 
Muthuraman wrote a weekly column for The Hindu Tamil named Cinema Eduththu Paar; all articles were later published as a single book in paperback format.

Awards

Filmfare Awards South
 1977 – Best Director – Tamil for Oru Oodhappu Kan Simittugiradhu
 1978 – Best Director – Tamil for Bhuvana Oru Kelvi Kuri
Tamil Nadu State Film Awards
 1979 – Best Director for Aarilirunthu Arubathu Varai
 2012 – Lifetime Achievement Award – South

Filmography

As director

TV series

References

Bibliography

Further reading
சினிமா எடுத்துப் பார்

External links 

Film directors from Tamil Nadu
Tamil film directors
Living people
People from Sivaganga district
20th-century Indian film directors
Filmfare Awards South winners
Tamil Nadu State Film Awards winners
Tamil film producers
Film producers from Tamil Nadu
1935 births